The U.S. Virgin Islands Paradise Jam is a NCAA college basketball tournament that takes place annually in late November. The men's tournament typically takes place the week before Thanksgiving, with the women's tournament occurring during Thanksgiving week. It is held in St. Thomas at the Sports and Fitness Center on the campus of the University of the Virgin Islands. Colorado State is the defending men's champion. Texas A&M and Arizona are the defending women's champions in the Reef and Island divisions, respectively.

Format
Paradise Jam began in 2000 as a women's basketball tournament; a men's tournament was added the following year. In its current format, both tournaments feature eight teams that each play three games.

Men's format
The men's tournament was introduced in 2001 with a six-team, three-game group play format. In 2006, the tournament was expanded to eight teams and a bracket format was adopted. All teams play three games in the tournament, with the final day's games determining the tournament standings: a championship game, third-place game, fifth-place game, and seventh-place game are all played.

Women's format
The format of the women's tournament has changed multiple times throughout the existence of Paradise Jam. The first tournament in 2000 featured four teams that played two games each. In 2001, the women's tournament was altered to include three divisions — St. Thomas, St. John, and St. Croix. The following year, the St. Croix division was dropped, and two divisions were used going forward. In 2008, the format was adjusted to its current form, which features the Reef and Island divisions with four teams playing in each division. All teams play three games in the tournament, with the final day's games determining placement in all positions, first through fourth in each division.

Tournament history

Men's tournament

*The 2020 tournament was condensed and played at Walter E. Washington Convention Center in Washington, D.C. due to the COVID-19 pandemic

Women's tournament

Tournaments held outside of the Virgin Islands

2017
The 2017 men's and women's tournaments were moved to the U.S. mainland due to heavy damage caused by Hurricanes Irma and Maria. The tournament organizers decided to solicit hosting bids from all participating teams in both tournaments, with each tournament intended to be hosted by a participating school. The substitute venue for the 2017 men's tournament was Vines Center at Liberty University in Lynchburg, Virginia. The 2017 women's tournament took place in two different venues, with the Reef division playing at the Charles E. Smith Center on the campus of George Washington University in Washington, D.C. and the Island division at the neutral Titan Field House at Eastern Florida State College in Melbourne, Florida, presumably after no school in the Island division submitted a bid. The tournament moved back to the Virgin Islands in 2018.

2020
Due to the COVID-19 pandemic, the 2020 men's tournament was relocated to Washington, D.C., as travel restrictions prevented the tournament from being held in the U.S. Virgin Islands as normal. The tournament took place November 26–28, 2020 at the Walter E. Washington Convention Center in Washington, D.C. The tournament was condensed from the typical eight teams to just four teams — Belmont, George Mason, Howard, and Queens (N.C.). Belmont went undefeated, beating the three other teams to win the 2020 men's tournament. The 2020 women's tournament was cancelled.

References

External links
 Official site of the U.S. Virgin Island Paradise Jam Tournament

 
College men's basketball competitions in the United States
College women's basketball competitions in the United States
College basketball competitions
Recurring sporting events established in 2000
Basketball in the United States Virgin Islands
2000 establishments in the United States Virgin Islands